Albert Edward Handcock, 5th Baron Castlemaine (26 March 1863 – 6 July 1937), styled The Honourable from 1869 to 1892, was an Irish peer.

Background
Born at East Hill, Athlone, he was the second son of Richard Handcock, 4th Baron Castlemaine and his wife Hon. Louisa Matilda Harris, only daughter of William Harris, 2nd Baron Harris. In 1892, he succeeded his father as baron. Handcock was educated at Eton College and went then to Christ Church, Oxford, where he graduated with a Bachelor of Arts in 1895. He was a Knight of Grace of the Most Venerable Order of the Hospital of St John of Jerusalem.

Career
Handcock served in the British Army as lieutenant of the 4th Royal Inniskilling Fusiliers. In 1898, he was elected a representative peer to the House of Lords. Previously a Deputy Lieutenant of that county, he was appointed Lord Lieutenant of Westmeath in 1899, a post he held until its abolishment with the Irish Free State Constitution Act in 1922.

Family
On 25 September 1895, he married Annie Evelyn Barrington, only daughter of Colonel Joseph Thomas Barrington, at St George's, Hanover Square, and had by her an only daughter. Handcock died, aged 74 at London and was succeeded in the barony by his younger brother Robert.

Arms

References

Books

1863 births
1937 deaths
Alumni of Christ Church, Oxford
Albert
Lord-Lieutenants of Westmeath
Irish representative peers
People educated at Eton College